The Canarian People's Union (UPC) was a left-wing nationalist political coalition operating in the Canary Islands. The party aim was self-determination for the islands and socialism. It was a coalition between various political parties and groups, with a communist, pro-independence or nationalist ideology.

Members of the coalition
The political parties that formed the Coalition were:

 Communist Party of the Canary Islands (provisional) (PCC(p)), later called Party of the Canarian Revolution. 
 Células Comunistas (CC)
 Party of Communist Unification in the Canaries (PUCC), later called Revolutionary Left Movement of the Canarian Archipelago.
 Canarian Assembly (AC)  
 Socialist Party of the Canary Islands (PSC), split of the Popular Socialist Party
 Canarian Nationalist Autonomous Confederation (CANC)
 Radicales de Base, linked to the United Canarian People (PCU).

Election results

Congress of Deputies

See also
 Canarian nationalism

References

Defunct political party alliances in Spain
Political parties in the Canary Islands
Defunct nationalist parties in Spain
Defunct socialist parties in Spain
Political parties established in 1979
Regionalist parties in Spain
1979 establishments in Spain
Canarian nationalist parties
Left-wing nationalist parties